"Bara få va mig själv" is a song by Swedish singer-songwriter Laleh, taken as the first single from her sixth studio album, Kristaller. It was written by Laleh, Gustaf Thörn, Gino Yonan, and Frank Nobel while being produced by Laleh. It was released on 6 April 2016 through Warner Music Sweden.

It is her highest-charting song on the Sverigetopplistan, peaking at number five, and was nominated for Song of the Year at the 2017 Grammis.

Background and composition
After a period of work as songwriter and producer in the United States, where she worked with artists such as Demi Lovato, Tori Kelly and Adam Levine, she returned to Sweden and released "Bara få va mig själv" as the lead single off her sixth album Kristaller. The song was first released exclusively to radio stations and Spotify on 6 May 2016, and was made available on all platforms two days later, the same day that tickets for the Kristaller Tour went on sale. All of her previous lead singles had been in English, with this marking her first in Swedish.

Laleh said the song was "a story about finding your own voice and the difference between learning from others and being controlled by others" while A Bit of Pop Music described it as "one of the most poppy and upbeat things she has released," adding that it was a "sure-fire hit." Scandipop called it a "rousing, beat-driven pop number."

Ccommercial performance
The song debuted on the Sverigetopplistan Singles Top 100 at number 16 on the chart dated 15 April 2016 and later peaked at number five on its sixth week, becoming her highest-charting song. It remained on the official Swedish chart for a total of 68 non-consecutive weeks.

It also reached number one on the Svensktoppen on 3 July, a spot it sat in as late as October, and peaked at number five on the DigiListan chart tracking digital sales on 22 May.

In December, it was announced that Bara få va mig själv was the year's most-streamed Swedish song on Spotify, with over 30 million plays.

Music video
The official music video, directed and edited by Laleh herself, was released on 8 April 2016, the same day the song was released for digital download. It was filmed in Los Angeles, where Laleh had recently moved to. As of August 2021 the video has over 15 million views on YouTube.

Awards and nominations

Charts and certifications

Weekly charts

Year-end charts

Certifications

References

Laleh (singer) songs
2016 songs
2016 singles
Warner Music Group singles
Swedish-language songs
Songs written by Laleh (singer)